Čelje is a small village in the hills southwest of Prem, in the Municipality of Ilirska Bistrica, in the Inner Carniola region of Slovenia.

The local church in the settlement is dedicated to Saint Jerome and belongs to the Parish of Prem.

References

External links
Čelje on Geopedia

Populated places in the Municipality of Ilirska Bistrica